Prince Mabandla Ndawombili Fred Dlamini (born 11 November 1930) was Prime Minister of Swaziland from 23 November 1979 to 25 March 1983.

References 

1930 births
Living people
Prime Ministers of Eswatini
Swazi royalty